D5 is a state road in the eastern Croatia the A3 motorway Okučani interchange to a number of cities in the western Slavonia region, including Pakrac and Daruvar, as well as to Drava River valley city of Virovitica. The road also links international border crossings Terezino Polje and Stara Gradiška providing access to Barcs, Hungary and Bosanska Gradiška, Bosnia and Herzegovina respectively.

The road, as well as all other state roads in Croatia, is managed and maintained by Hrvatske ceste, a state-owned company.

Traffic volume 
Traffic is regularly counted and reported by Hrvatske ceste, operator of the road.

Road junctions and populated areas

Maps

Sources

D005
D005
D005
D005
D005
Buildings and structures in Bjelovar-Bilogora County